Hypenodes sombrus is a species of moth in the family Erebidae. It was described by Douglas C. Ferguson in 1954. It is found in Canada from Nova Scotia to western Alberta. The habitat consists of bogs, cattail marshes, dry pine and other woodlands.

References

Moths described in 1954
Hypenodinae
Moths of North America